The 2015–16 Latvian Football Cup is the 21st season of the Latvian annual football knock-out competition. The winners will qualify for the first qualifying round of the 2016–17 UEFA Europa League.

First round 
The matches of this round took place on 8-22 June 2015.

|-
!colspan="3" align="center"|8 June

|-
!colspan="3" align="center"|9 June

|-
!colspan="3" align="center"|10 June

|-
!colspan="3" align="center"|13 June

|-
!colspan="3" align="center"|14 June

|-
!colspan="3" align="center"|22 June

|}

Second round 
The matches of this round took place on 4-8 July 2015.

|-
!colspan="3" align="center"|4 July

|-
!colspan="3" align="center"|5 July

|-
!colspan="3" align="center"|7 July

|-
!colspan="3" align="center"|8 July

|}

Third round 
The matches of this round took place on 11-13 July 2015.

|-
!colspan="3" align="center"|11 July

|-
!colspan="3" align="center"|12 July

|-
!colspan="3" align="center"|13 July

|}

Round of 16 
The matches of this round took place from 18 July to 16 September 2015. Babīte received a bye.

|-
!colspan="3" align="center"|18 July

|-
!colspan="3" align="center"|19 July

|-
!colspan="3" align="center"|29 July

|-
!colspan="3" align="center"|5 August

|-
!colspan="3" align="center"|16 September

|}

Quarter-finals 
The matches were played on 9, 10 and 13 April 2016.

|-
!colspan="3" align="center"|9 April

|-
!colspan="3" align="center"|10 April

|-
!colspan="3" align="center"|13 April

|}

Semi-finals 
The first leg will be played on 27 April 2016 and the second leg on 4 May 2016.

|}

Final 
The final will be played on 22 May 2016.
Slokas stadionā, Jūrmalā
Referee : Aleksandrs Anufrijevs  

|}

References

External links 
 LFF.lv

Latvian Football Cup seasons
Latvian Football Cup
Cup
Cup